Laff-A-Lympics is an American animated comedy television series produced by Hanna-Barbera. The series premiered as part of the Saturday-morning cartoon program block Scooby's All-Star Laff-A-Lympics, on ABC in 1977. The show is a spoof of the Olympics and the ABC primetime series Battle of the Network Stars, which debuted one year earlier. It featured 45 Hanna-Barbera characters organized into teams (the Scooby Doobies, the Yogi Yahooeys, and the Really Rottens) which competed each week for gold, silver, and bronze medals. One season of 16 episodes was produced in 1977–78, and eight new episodes combined with reruns for the 1978–79 season as Scooby's All-Stars. Unlike most cartoon series produced by Hanna-Barbera in the 1970s, Laff-A-Lympics did not contain a laugh track. Scooby’s Laff-a-Lympics was originally owned by Taft Broadcasting, Warner Bros. Domestic Television Distribution currently owns the series through its two in-name-only units, Warner Bros. Family Entertainment and Turner Entertainment.

The "all-star" cast was mostly made up of characters from other Hanna-Barbera series. The "Scooby Doobies" included characters from Scooby-Doo, Where Are You!, Captain Caveman and the Teen Angels, Speed Buggy and Dynomutt, Dog Wonder; the "Yogi Yahooeys" had characters from The Yogi Bear Show, The Huckleberry Hound Show and The Quick Draw McGraw Show. The only original characters were some members of the Really Rottens.

In 1978, Hanna-Barbera produced another "all-star" show with a similar theme, titled Yogi's Space Race.

Format
The sporting competitions in which the characters are called upon to compete are often comical or offbeat versions of Olympic sports, races, or scavenger hunts. Each segment is set in a different location around the world.

Episodes are presented in a format similar to an Olympic television broadcast, with an unseen announcer. Hosting duties and commentary are provided by Snagglepuss and Mildew Wolf (from It's the Wolf! segments of Cattanooga Cats voiced by John Stephenson impersonating Paul Lynde). Snagglepuss and Mildew wear animated versions of the contemporary yellow jackets of ABC Sports announcers. Other Hanna-Barbera characters such as Fred Flintstone, Barney Rubble, Jabberjaw and Peter Potamus made appearances as guest announcers and judges. Other non-competing characters include parents of contestants (interviewed by Mildew before the events) and various monsters and creatures that serve as antagonists during the events.

The "good guy" teams, consisting of the Yogi Yahooeys and the Scooby Doobies, are cooperative and loyal. The Really Rottens, however, always cheat. Typically, the Really Rottens would be poised to win before making a fatal error at the last moment, allowing one of the other two teams to end up on top. Occasionally, though, the Rottens' cheating was not actually against the rules, resulting in their winning (overall, the Scooby team dominated, winning 14 times, against seven victories for the Yahooies, two for the Rottens, and a three-way-tie in the final episode).

Only one complete season of Laff-A-Lympics episodes was produced, with eight new episodes combined with reruns for the second season of Scooby's All Star Laff-A-Lympics (billed as Scooby's All-Stars). When it premiered in the fall of 1977, the series consisted of several segments, including "Captain Caveman and the Teen Angels" (which led the two-hour program and later was spun off into its own half-hour show), "The Scooby-Doo Show" and "Dynomutt, Dog Wonder" (both of which featured a small number of newly produced segments alongside repeated segments from earlier seasons) and the "Laff-A-Lympics" segments themselves. The show resurfaced in 1980 as a half-hour series on its own (without the "Captain Caveman", "Scooby-Doo" and "Dynomutt" cartoons) simply titled Laff-A-Lympics and was later rerun on ABC in 1986. In later years, it has been frequently rerun on USA Cartoon Express, Cartoon Network and Boomerang, often during the time periods when the Summer and Winter Olympics were held (until 2014).

Teams

The Scooby Doobies

This team drew mainly from the 1970s Hanna-Barbera cartoons, particularly the "mystery-solving" series derived from Scooby-Doo, whose titular character served as team captain. The early production art for the series showed Jeannie from the Jeannie series and Melody, Alexander, Alexandra, and Sebastian the Cat from Josie and the Pussycats as members of the "Scooby Doobies" team. However, legal problems with Columbia Pictures Television, Screen Gems' successor, prevented this. Hanna-Barbera owned Babu, but Columbia controlled all rights to Jeannie's image, including her cartoon form at the time, until Warner Bros. purchased Hanna-Barbera in 1996. As a result of these issues, Babu appeared alone as a member of the "Scooby Doobies". Similarly, Archie Comics held the rights to the Josie characters. In the actual series, Jeannie is replaced by Hong Kong Phooey and the Josie characters were replaced by characters from Captain Caveman and the Teen Angels.

Among the members of the Scooby Doobies are:

The Yogi Yahooeys
This team drew mainly from the 1950s and 1960s Hanna-Barbera cartoons and is the only team of characters made up completely of anthropomorphic animals. Grape Ape is the only post-1962 character in the line-up.

Among the members of the Yogi Yahooeys are:

The Really Rottens
This team is composed of villainous characters that frequently cheated by either giving themselves an unfair advantage in a contest or sabotaging the other teams (and usually had points deducted from their score as a result). With the exception of Mumbly and the Dalton Brothers, all of the members are original characters. Originally, Muttley and Dick Dastardly were planned as the leaders of the Really Rottens; however, they could not appear as those characters were co-owned by Heatter-Quigley Productions. In their place, Hanna-Barbera used the existing character Mumbly and created the new character Dread Baron. Prior to Laff-A-Lympics, on his original show, Mumbly was a heroic detective rather than a villain. Following the character's revision as the villainous team leader, he remained a villain in Yogi Bear and the Magical Flight of the Spruce Goose, which is also Dread Baron's only other role. The Dalton Brothers appeared in 1950s and 1960s shorts (including the 1958 short Sheriff Huckleberry Hound, which featured appearances by Dinky, Dirty, and Dastardly Dalton, as well as their other brothers Dangerous, Detestable, Desperate, and Despicable). However, they were given new character designs for the Laff-A-Lympics series. After Laff-A-Lympics, Dinky reappears in The Good, the Bad, and Huckleberry Hound with brothers Stinky (who bears a resemblance to Dastardly Dalton from Laff-A-Lympics), Finky, and Pinky.

Among the members of the Really Rottens are:

Cast
 Daws Butler as Yogi Bear, Augie Doggie, Huckleberry Hound, Quick Draw McGraw, Wally Gator, Snagglepuss, Mr. Jinks, Dixie, Hokey Wolf, Super Snooper, Blabber Mouse, Scooby-Dum, Dastardly Dalton
 Don Messick as Boo Boo Bear, Pixie, Ranger Smith, Scooby-Doo, Mumbly, Dirty Dalton, Mr. Creepley, Junior Creepley, Announcer
 Julie Bennett as Cindy Bear
 John Stephenson as Doggie Daddy, Mildew Wolf, Dread Baron, The Great Fondoo
 Frank Welker as Jabberjaw, Yakky Doodle, Tinker, Dynomutt, Magic Rabbit, Sooey
 Mel Blanc as Captain Caveman, Speed Buggy, Barney Rubble 
 Bob Holt as Grape Ape, Dinky Dalton, Orful Octopus
 Vernee Watson-Johnson as Dee Dee Skyes
 Marilyn Schreffler as Brenda Chance, Daisy Mayhem 
 Laurel Page as Taffy Dare, Mrs. Creepley 
 Scatman Crothers as Hong Kong Phooey 
 Gary Owens as Blue Falcon
 Alan Reed as Fred Flintstone (earlier episodes)
 Henry Corden as Fred Flintstone (later episodes)
 Casey Kasem as Shaggy Rogers
 Joe Besser as Babu

Episodes

Season 1 – Scooby's All-Star Laff-A-Lympics (1977)

Season 2 – Scooby's All-Stars (1978)

Home release

VHS
In 1996, four VHS editions of the show were released in the US on the NTSC format, each containing two episodes for a running time of approximately 50 minutes:

 Heavens to Hilarity, This Is It, Sports Fans!
 Yippee for the Yogi Yahooeys!
 On Your Marks, Get Set — Go Scoobys!
 Something Smells Really Rotten

At the same time a "bumper special" VHS tape was released in the UK on the PAL format containing the following episodes (these UK episodes were the US episodes divided in two, with just one location per episode):

 "Grand Canyon"
 "Ireland"
 "Israel"
 "Swiss Alps"
 "Tokyo"
 "Acapulco"
 "Baghdad"
 "Florida"
 "China"
 "Italy"
 "Kitty Hawk"

DVD
Warner Home Video (via Hanna-Barbera and Warner Bros. Family Entertainment) released episodes 1–4 on Region 1 DVD on January 19, 2010, as Scooby's All-Star Laff-A-Lympics Volume 1. Episodes 5–8 were on a second DVD titled Scooby's All-Star Laff-A-Lympics Volume 2, released the same day by Target and by other stores on October 19, 2010. A two-disc DVD set entitled Scooby-Doo! Laff-A-Lympics: Spooky Games was released on July 17, 2012. The set contains an all-new Scooby Doo special, "Spooky Games", plus 12 episodes of Laff-a-Lympics – including episodes 9–16, which complete the first season, plus four earlier first-season episodes which appear on Volume 1 and 2. The set also includes an UltraViolet digital copy of the 12 contained episodes. Later in the year, the Warner Brothers shop renamed this release Laff-a-Lympics: The Complete First Collection.

On July 4, 2016, Volume 1 and Volume 2 were released separately in Region 2, as was a 'Gold Edition' with the previously released Spooky Games DVD; this Region 2 version of the Scooby-Doo! Laff-A-Lympics: Spooky Games DVD is only a separate version of the first disc from the R1 set, containing "Spooky Games" and four further episodes; therefore, only 12 episodes are currently available in R2, as of July 2016.

Region 4 received Volume 1 and 2 in July 2010.

Other media

Comic books
In March 1978, Marvel Comics produced a comic book series based on the cartoon. Creative staff for the comic book included Mark Evanier, Carl Gafford, Scott Shaw!, Jack Manning, Owen Fitzgerald and others. The series lasted 13 issues. A Laff-A-Lympics comic book was also published in Australia in 1978 by Sydney-based K.G. Murray Publishing Company. From 1980 to 1982, various Laff-A-Lympics stories were reprinted in Laff-A-Lympics Annual hardback books in the United Kingdom by Fleetway.

An updated Laff-A-Lympics called the "Superstar Olympics" appeared in Hanna-Barbera Presents #6 in 1996. The Superstar Olympics featured Atom Ant, Augie Doggie and Doggie Daddy, Barney Rubble, Betty Rubble, Boo Boo Bear, Chopper, Cindy Bear, Dick Dastardly, Fred Flintstone, the Grape Ape, Hokey Wolf, Huckleberry Hound, Jabberjaw, Magilla Gorilla, Muttley, Peter Potamus, Pixie and Dixie and Mr. Jinks, Quick Draw McGraw, Ranger Smith, Secret Squirrel, Snagglepuss, Snooper and Blabber, Squiddly Diddly, Top Cat, Touché Turtle, Wally Gator, Wilma Flintstone, and Yogi Bear.

Games
A Laff-A-Lympics hand-held pinball game was released in 1978. The game featured Scooby-Doo, Captain Caveman, Dee Dee, Taffy, Blue Falcon, Yogi Bear, Boo-Boo Bear, Huckleberry Hound, Grape Ape, Mumbly, Dread Baron, Mr. Creepley, Dalton Brothers, Snagglepuss, and Mildew Wolf.

In 1979, Hanna-Barbera released a Laff-A-Lympics Old Maid card game that included Scooby-Doo, Shaggy Rogers, Dynomutt, Blue Falcon, Hong Kong Phooey, Yogi Bear, Boo-Boo Bear, Huckleberry Hound, Grape Ape, Quick Draw McGraw, Pixie and Dixie, Yakky Doodle, Mumbly, Dread Baron, Snagglepuss, and Mildew Wolf.

Other appearances
Dread Baron and Mumbly appear in Yogi Bear and the Magical Flight of the Spruce Goose. While Don Messick reprised Mumbly, Dread Baron was voiced by Paul Winchell.

Dinky Dalton appears in the Yogi's Treasure Hunt episode "The Return of El Kabong" voiced by Stacy Keach, Sr. He is shown to be with his brothers Desperate Dalton and Despicable Dalton.

Dinky Dalton appears in The Good, the Bad, and Huckleberry Hound voiced by Allan Melvin. As mentioned above, he has brothers named Finky Dalton (voiced by Pat Fraley), Pinky Dalton (voiced by Charlie Adler), and Stinky Dalton (voiced by Michael Bell). This same line-up also appeared in an episode of Wacky Races with Dinky voiced by Christopher Judge, Finky voiced by Tom Kenny, Pinky voiced by Diedrich Bader, and Stinky voiced by Billy West.

The Dread Baron appears in Jellystone!. He was seen in "Jailcation" where he was apprehended by the Jellystone Police Department and became an inmate at Santo Relaxo.

Cultural references
 Laff-A-Lympics was parodied in the Robot Chicken episode "Ban on the Fun". In a segment that parodies Laff-A-Lympics in the style of the 1972 Munich massacre, the Yogi Yahooeys are taken hostage and murdered by the Really Rottens. In retaliation, the Scooby Doobies alongside Snooper and Blabber arm themselves and kill the Really Rottens. The sketch itself lampoons the theatrical trailer for Steven Spielberg's 2005 film Munich. The sketch featured Blue Falcon, Boo-Boo Bear, Captain Caveman, Daisy Mayhem, Dinky and Dirty Dalton, Doggie Daddy, Dread Baron, Dynomutt, The Great Fondoo, Hong Kong Phooey, Huckleberry Hound, Mumbly, Quick Draw McGraw (as El Kabong), Snagglepuss, Scooby-Doo, Scooby-Dum, Scrappy-Doo (who was never a member of the Scooby Doobies), Shaggy Rogers, Snooper and Blabber, Wally Gator, and Yogi Bear.
 The series was also parodied in the Harvey Birdman, Attorney at Law episode "Grape Juiced" with Grape Ape voiced by John Michael Higgins and Beegle Beagle voiced by Doug Preis. In that episode, Grape Ape is accused of using steroids at the recent Laff-A-Lympics event. Yakky Doodle, Grape Ape's teammate from the Yogi Yahooeys, also makes a cameo appearance as a witness during Grape Ape's trial. The Magic Rabbit makes a cameo in the episode "SPF" as a victim of CyberSquatting.
 The Really Rottens (consisting of Mumbly, Daisy Mayhem, Mr. Creepley, Orful Octopus, and the Dalton Brothers) made a cameo appearance in The Cleveland Show episode "Ship'rect". In the episode, Mumbly is the captain of a boat crewed by the Really Rottens in a Floaterboat Race.

References

External links
 
 Laff-a-Lympics Event Results

1970s American animated television series
1977 American television series debuts
1978 American television series endings
American children's animated comedy television series
American children's animated fantasy television series
American children's animated sports television series
English-language television shows
American Broadcasting Company original programming
American animated television spin-offs
Crossover animated television series
Fictional games
Fictional sports teams
Huckleberry Hound television series
Olympic Games in fiction
Scooby-Doo television series
Television series by Hanna-Barbera
Yogi Bear television series
Captain Caveman and the Teen Angels
Television series created by Joe Ruby
Television series created by Ken Spears
Television series about cavemen